László Szatmári (born 18 May 1977) is a Hungarian motorcycle speedway rider who is a member of Hungary's national team.

See also 
 Hungary national speedway team

References 

1977 births
Living people
Hungarian speedway riders